The Tiberiu Popoviciu Institute of Numerical Analysis  (ICTP) is a mathematics research institute of the Romanian Academy, based in Cluj-Napoca, Romania. 

ICTP is coordinated by the Mathematical Section and belongs to the Cluj-Napoca Branch of the Romanian Academy. The Institute performs fundamental research mainly in the field of Numerical Analysis.

ICTP was founded in 1951, as the Mathematical Section of the Cluj-Napoca Branch, with residence at 37 Republicii Street.

References

External links
 

Mathematical institutes
Research institutes in Romania
Research institutes established in 1951
1951 establishments in Romania